Sandra Jayat (born c.1939) is a French writer and artist of Romani descent. who left her nomadic family at age 15 and travelled on her own from Italy to Paris, becoming associated with the surviving family of Django Reinhardt. In Paris she was encouraged by the writers Marcel Aymé and Jean Cocteau, plus as an artist by Chagall and Picasso. She published books of poetry and novels documenting the experience of Romanies in France and has advocated on behalf of Roma and Sinti at the international level, and is a recognised artist whose work has featured in well regarded exhibitions. She currently resides in Paris.

Early life
Jayat was born on the Italian–French border in 1938/1939 (some sources say 1940) to a nomadic family of (arguably Italian) Manouche Roma who were transiting at the time from Italy to France to escape the wartime persecution of Roma that was occurring in Italy. Finding that Roma were equally persecuted in northern France in the same period, the family moved on to southern France where conditions were less severe, and by the time Sandra was 14 were to be found back in north Italy in the Lombardy region, specifically in an encampment on the banks of Lake Maggiore.

On the eve of her fifteenth birthday it was announced that in accordance with the clan tradition she would be married to another Roma boy. The prospect terrified her and she decided to run away. Her grandfather had told her of the clan's "cousin", Django Reinhardt, a famous Romani guitarist, who lived in Paris, and she resolved to travel on her own to Paris in order to try to find him. The young girl travelled on her own overland to Paris over a period of many months, surviving, despite many hostilities, via the assistance of other Roma encampments along the way plus the kindness of strangers on occasion.

Upon her arrival in Paris in spring 1955 she discovered that Django had in fact died two years previously. However, she encountered a Jewish family of whom the mother had lost a child in a concentration camp during the war and who believed that Jayat was her child come back to her, and Jayat lived with this family until she could not stand the deception any longer. She claims to have eventually made contact with Django's surviving family and to have been accepted as an honorary daughter by the family, maintaining her connection with the family for a number of years.

Career 
Although she spoke two languages (Italian and Romani) at the time she arrived in Paris, and soon taught herself French, Jayat was unable to read and write at that point, since the children of the clan had never attended school, however over the next few years she taught herself to read and write in French and began to write poetry (in her own words: "At twenty I found freedom in words") and to produce drawings/paintings which caused her to come to the attention of prominent Parisian writers and artists of the day, the latter including Picasso and Chagall, her early work somewhat resembling that of the latter artist in particular.

Writing 
In 1961 she published a book of her book of poems entitled Herbes manouches ("Manouche Grass") with a cover design provided by the poet and visual artist Jean Cocteau with a preface by the French author J.-B. Cayeux; a second collection entitled Lunes nomades ("Nomad Moons") appeared in 1963, and a third Moudravi: où va l'amitié ("Moudravi: Where Friendship Goes") in 1966, including a cover designed by Marc Chagall.

She also showcased the work of others, co-presenting (with Jean-Pierre Rosnay) a 1963 volume entitled Poèmes pour ce temps (Poems for This Time) which featured the work of other young Parisian writers. While, in the words of Barrera, her first two volumes of poetry contained a sequence of images about Romani life and customs, her third volume was "a much more profound humanistic reflection on personal relations".

In the 1970s she produced two stories for children, Kourako and Les deux lunes de Savyo ("The Two Moons of Savyo"). In the words of Barrera:

Commencing in 1978, she produced four partly autobiographical novels: La Longue Route d'une Zingarina (The long road of a Zingarina) (1978), El romanes (The Romani elder) (1986), Les Racines du temps (The roots of time) (1998) and La Zingarina ou l'herbe sauvage (The Zingarina in the wild grass) (2010). Of her 1978 book, Barrera López wrote in 2020:

El romanès recounted the adventures of Romanino "El Romanès", a Spanish Romani man, during World War II, while regarding her next novel:

Finally, in La Zingarina ou l'herbe sauvage, the writer again recounted the story of her own life (as "Stellina") commencing with her escape from her encampment as a result of her refusal to marry and extended this time to her first years in Paris, this time in a text aimed for adults rather than children. Regarding this work, Barrera López wrote:

Art 
Simultaneous with her development as a writer, Jayat was also exploring the world of painting, being guided among others by Henri Mahé (1907–1975) as well as by gallery owner Émile Adès who from the early 1970s onwards exhibited her work alongside that of Chagall, Salvador Dalí and others. Her early artistic style has been described as "an innocently abstract, unassuming style ... inhabiting two, apparently contradictory states, dream and reality, which merge in the Surreal", while later works included some influences from cubism. An entry for her in "Benezit Dictionary of Artists" states:

According to Benezit's Dictionary, Jayat's work has been shown in collective exhibitions in 1983 and ongoing, and in solo exhibitions (1964-1992) in Paris, Trouville, Venice and Liège.

In 1985 Jayat co-organized the first international exhibition of Roma art in Paris, the "Première Mondiale D'art Tzigane".

In 1992 she painted a work entitled "Les gens du voyage" (the Travelling People) which was used as the design for a French postage stamp of denomination 2.5 NFR. In 2002, she created ddrawings for a set of 24 tarot cards which were published as Tarot Manouche: Universel du XXIè Siecle (21st Century Universal Manouche Tarot).

Music 
In the mid-1960s, Jayat began frequenting a venue on Paris, the Pleint Vent Club, which on its ground floor offered a bookstore and an exhibition hall, while its 13th-century vaulted basement offered a performance space for jazz and flamenco music; among these performances, Jayat presented recitations of her poetry accompanied by her friends Babik Reinhardt and Cérani (Jean Mailhes). She later met regularly with friends and acquaintances from the world of music, art and literature at the Adlon Club.

Following up her initial public performances, in 1967, Jayat recorded several songs (4 per disc), released on French Vogue as 2 EPs entitled "Il Ne Faut Pas (7-inch EP, 1967) and "Le Malentendu Millenaire" (7-inch EP, 1968). She also released a single "Chante Django Reinhardt" in 1972 which comprised her singing/reciting 2 songs/poems ("C'est Le Jour De Noel" and "Comme L'Eau Claire") over previous instrumental recordings by (late period) Django Reinhardt and quintette performing "Minor Swing" and "Tears", respectively; according to her sole known filmed interview, she was encouraged to release these creations by Django's widow, Naguine, with whom she had earlier formed a friendship.

Personal life 
As of the 2020s, Jayat (now in her 80s) continues to reside in Paris.

Works by Sandra Jayat

Poems (anthologies) 
 Herbes manouches (Manouche Grass), Paris, la Colombe, Éditions du Vieux Colombier, 1961
 Lunes nomades (Nomad moons), Paris, P. Seghers, 1963
 Moudravi où va l'amitié (Moudravi where does friendship go), illustration by Marc Chagall, Paris, Seghers, 1966
 Je ne suis pas née pour suivre (I was not born to follow), Edition Philippe Auzou, 1983

Stories 
 Les Deux lunes de Savyo (The Two Moons of Savyo) (1972) drawings by Jean-Paul Barthe
 Kourako (1972) illustrations by Jean-Paul Barthe
 Le Roseau d'argent (The silver reed) (1973)

Novels 
 La Longue Route d'une Zingarina (The long road of a Zingarina), illustrations by Giovanni Giannini, Paris, Bordas, 1978 
 El romanes (The Romanis), Paris, Magnard, 1986 
 Les Racines du temps (The roots of time), Cergy-Pontoise, Éd. Points de suspension, 1998 
 La Zingarina ou l'herbe sauvage (The Zingarina in the wild grass), Paris, Max Milo, 2010

Other 
 Tarot Manouche: Universel du XXIè Siecle (21st Century Universal Manouche Tarot). Sandra Jayat, 2002

Recordings

By Sandra Jayat 
 Il Ne Faut Pas (7-inch, EP) - RCA Victor, 1967
 Le Malentendu Millenaire (7-inch, EP) - RCA Victor, 1968
 Chante Django Reinhardt (7-inch, Single) - Vogue, 1972

By others 
 Suzanne Gabriello, Suzanne Gabriello, Unidisc UD 30 1257, 1974. Songs of Sandra Jayat, music by Jean-Pierre-Lang, with the participation of Petits Chanteurs d'Île-de-France directed by Jean Amoureux.
 Yves Mourousi, Sandra Jayat, La Pastorale des Gitans, Unidisc UD 30 1307, 1976. Five songs of Sandra Jayat (Serani Maille (guitare), Raymond Guyot, Ennio Morricone).
 Elisabeth Wiener, Manitas de Plata – Kourako Or La Guitare Aux Cordes D'Or, Arion OP 105, Canada, LP. 19?? Elisabeth Wiener reads Jayat's children's story "Kourako" with guitar accompaniment by Manitas de Plata.

Awards 
She was awarded a silver medal by the City of Paris in 1984 and a silver-gilt medal in 1992. Laurent-Fahier, 1991 states that other awards include Grand Prix de La littérature enfantine in 1972, the gold medal of  la Fondation internationale des écrivains, peintres, poètes et journalistes in 1976, the Prix International de peinture Toulouse-Lautrec in 1977, the Grand Prix du livre in Stockholm in 1978, and the gold medal of l'Institut supérieur international des Études humanistes in 1980.

Notes

References

Bibliography 
 Daphne Maurice, 1973. "Sandra Jayat. The Gypsy Poetess". Journal of the Gypsy Lore Society 3, 52, pp. 91–93. Accessed 30 December 2022
 Sandra Jayat, 1985: "Introduction", in Première Mondiale d’Art Tzigane. La Conciergerie, Paris, du 6 mai au 30 mai 1985 [Exhibition catalogue] (Paris)
 Ariette Laurent-Fahier, 1991. "Sandra Jayat: un destin exceptionnel". Créations 52: 20–24. Accessed 30 December 2022
 Exposition Sandra Jayat, peintre manouche (Exhibition "Sandra Jayat, gypsy painter"), City of Marcoussis, March 25 to Saturday April 11, 2009: description at https://www.arts-spectacles.com/25-mars-au-11-avril-exposition-Sandra-Jayat-peintre-manouche-mediatheque-de-Marcoussis-91_a1783.html
 Benezit Dictionary of Artists, 2006 edition, volume 7: Herring - Koornstra. Gründ, Paris, 2006. ISBN 270003077X (S. Jayat entry on p. 776). Accessed 30 December 2022
 Tímea Junghaus & Katalin Székely (eds), 2006: "Meet Your Neighbours: Contemporary Roma Art from Europe" (English Translation). Open Society Institute, ISBN 9639419990. 
 Begoña Barrera López, 2020: "Sandra Jayat. Construir y dignificar la diferencia" (Sandra Jayat. Constructing and Dignifying Difference) [in Spanish]. Arenal 27(2): 531–557. DOI:10.30827/arenal.v27i2.6533. Accessed 30 December 2022
 Begoña Barrera, 2022: "The Long Road in Search of a Tzigane Language: Sandra Jayat". pp. 53–70 in Eve Rosenhaft and María Sierra (eds), European Roma Lives Beyond Stereotypes (Liverpool). Accessed 30 December 2022

External links
 Sandra Jayat: article on French Wikipedia
 
 YouTube copies of "Sandra Jayat chante Django Reinhardt" single (1972) - "C'est Le Jour De Noel" (Minor Swing) and "Comme L'eau Claire" (Tears)
 Ariette Laurent-Fahier, 1991. "Sandra Jayat: un destin exceptionnel". Créations 52: 20–24. Good article (text in French) with reproductions of a number of Jayat's artworks
 First day cover featuring Jayat's French postage stamp design plus additional artwork, from page on filsduvent.kazeo.com
  Sandra C., 2013: Le fabuleux destin de Sandra Jayat !. An account of a 2013 interview with Sandra Jayat in Paris.

1939 births
Living people
French Romani people
French artists
French-language poets
French-language writers
French poetry
20th-century French painters